4-Carboxybenzaldehyde (CBA) is an organic compound with the formula OCHC6H4CO2H.  It consists of a benzene ring substituted with both an aldehyde and a carboxylic acid, with these functional groups on opposite corners of the ring.  This compound is formed in 0.5% yield as a byproduct in the production terephthalic acid from p-xylene. Since approximately 40,000,000 tons of terephthalic acid are produced per year, CBA is a relatively large scale industrial chemical.

See also
2-Carboxybenzaldehyde

References 

Benzaldehydes
Benzoic acids
Aldehydic acids